The Forum is a community building in Norwich, Norfolk in England. It stands opposite St Peter Mancroft Church. Built on the site of the previous Norwich Library which burnt down in 1994, the Forum was designed by Michael Hopkins and Partners, and built as a millennium project for the East of England, being finished in October 2001. The Forum is part of Norwich 12, a collection of notable buildings in Norwich spanning the Norman, medieval, Georgian, Victorian and modern eras. It is visited by more than 2.5 million people every year.

The majority of the public area of the building is occupied by the Norfolk & Norwich Millennium (NML) library, which spans across all three floors and has been regularly named as the most popular library in the UK. The building was also home to the local Tourist Information Centre, which has now been replaced with a citizens' advice centre, and currently houses the BBC East offices and studios, where the regional television news bulletin BBC Look East and local radio station BBC Radio Norfolk are based. An open mezzanine looks out across the floor and the glass front of the building, and currently houses a Pizza Express restaurant. The amphitheatre-like steps at the front have provided a venue for functions such as amateur theatrical performances, outdoor opera, musical competitions, art exhibitions, processions, and celebrations. Because the Forum is funded partly by lottery grants, they hold certain events which are free of charge for people to attend. The Forum is commonly used as a meeting place, and the plaza area attracts skateboarders and free runners.

References

External links
 The Forum
 Norfolk County Council

Buildings and structures completed in 2001
Buildings and structures in Norwich
Public libraries in Norfolk
Tourist attractions in Norwich
Art museums and galleries in Norfolk
Buildings by Hopkins Architects